Concordia, United States Virgin Islands may refer to:
Concordia, Saint Croix, United States Virgin Islands
Concordia, Saint John, United States Virgin Islands